Tom Langan is an American producer and writer. He additionally has performed in acting roles.

Contributions

Positions held
Days of Our Lives
Co-Executive Producer: April 21, 1992 – March 28, 2002
Producer: 1991 - 1992
Head Writer: November 11, 1999 - March 28, 2002

Days of our Lives: Primetime Specials
Winter Heat: February 4, 1994
Night Sins: February 26, 1993
One Stormy Night: January 10, 1992

The Young and the Restless
Producer: 1986 - 1991
Associate Producer: 1980 - 1986

Intimate Portrait: Lisa Rinna: 2001
As himself

Head writing tenure

Executive Producing Tenure

References

External links

American soap opera writers
American male screenwriters
Daytime Emmy Award winners
Place of birth missing (living people)
Year of birth missing (living people)
Living people
Soap opera producers
American television producers
American male television writers